General Babcock may refer to:

John B. Babcock (1843–1909), U.S. Army brigadier general
Joshua Babcock (1707–1783), Rhode Island State Militia major general in the American Revolutionary War
Orville E. Babcock (1835–1884), Union Army brevet brigadier general